Brendan Reilly (5 January 1979 – 16 September 2017) was an Irish Gaelic footballer.
He came from a farming family outside Ardee, County Louth. At club level, he played with his local team John Mitchels (partly founded by his father Eugene Reilly) and later Naomh Máirtín.
He represented his county Louth at senior level for several years. He died suddenly after leading his Naomh Martin team to a semi-final win.

References

1979 births
2017 deaths
Louth inter-county Gaelic footballers